This is a list of settlements in Norfolk by population based on the results of the 2011 census. The following United Kingdom census took place in 2021. In 2011, there were 23 built-up area subdivisions with 5,000 or more inhabitants in Norfolk, shown in the table below.

Population ranking

See also 

 Norfolk

References 

Norfolk
Norfolk-related lists
Norfolk